State Road 934 (SR 934) runs for  from State Road 826 (Palmetto Expressway) in Medley to SR A1A in Miami Beach. It is a major east–west highway in the Miami metropolitan area.

State Road 934 is, for its longest span, Northwest 79th Street in Miami, but also traverses a variety of names as it crosses Hialeah Gardens, Hialeah, North Bay Village, and Miami Beach as Northeast 74th Street, the Hialeah Expressway and 21st Street in Hialeah, as the North 79th/81st Street one-way pair in Miami, the John F. Kennedy Causeway as it crosses Biscayne Bay, and as Normandy Drive and 71st Street in North Beach, Miami Beach (the last two forming a one-way pair in Miami Beach, respectively).

Route description

State Road 934 begins at the Palmetto Expressway in Medley.  About two blocks east of the expressway, it crosses Milam Dairy Road/West 72nd Avenue, becoming the Hialeah Expressway, a limited access stretch of highway that extends to US 27 (SR 25), and ends at Red Road (West 4th Avenue, SR 823).  The Okeechobee Metrorail station is located one block south of SR 934 on US 27.  The expressway, however, does not have any complete interchanges; it is made up of at-grade intersections at each end of the expressway and between them, they consist of a single westbound off ramp onto North 74th Street near West 69th Avenue, a half diamond with US 27 and an at-grade intersection with West 12th Avenue.  Signage along Hialeah Expressway is minimal as only the westbound off ramp onto US 27 (Okeechobee Road) has a sign with the destination street on it.

East of Red Road, the road continues east, passing by the Hialeah Metrorail station and the Hialeah Park Race Track on the north side of the road.  At East 4th Avenue in Hialeah, SR 934 tracks north for four blocks around the park before resuming its east–west orientation, where it passes the Hialeah Hospital and intersects with SR 953.  The road continues east, with the Metrorail line in the center section of the road until just west of West 27th Avenue (SR 9).  Just east of West 14th Avenue, SR 934 becomes a one way pair, with three eastbound lanes and a westbound lane on 79th Street, mainly as a business loops and a truck route, and two westbound lanes on 81st Street, which has no businesses on the road and does not allow trucks.  The one way pairs then intersect with West 7th Avenue (SR 441)/SR 7 and I-95, before 81st Street spurs north to become 82nd Street.  After intersecting US 1/SR 5, the roads rejoin just west of the western end of Biscayne Bay and the John F. Kennedy Causeway.  The causeway crosses four islands and has two drawbridges. On the Isle of Normandy, the road becomes a one way pair again before it reaches the end of the causeway to Miami Beach, where it ends at SR A1A.

West of the terminus, the road continues as NW 74th Street, extending west through residential streets to Galloway Road (West 87th Avenue) in Medley, and west of that intersection going through an undeveloped section of northwest Miami-Dade county to end at an intersection with the Homestead Extension of Florida's Turnpike (HEFT).

History

The SR 934 designation was assigned to the road in 1983; prior to that, the portion between Interstate 95 (SR 9A) and SR A1A was signed State Road 828.

NW 74th Street was extended from NW 87th Avenue west to the Homestead Extension of the Turnpike, opening in the Spring of 2010.

Major intersections

References

External links

934
934
1983 establishments in Florida
Monuments and memorials to John F. Kennedy in the United States